Sally Thomsett (born 3 April 1950) is an English actress who starred as Phyllis in the film The Railway Children (1970) and played Jo in the TV sitcom Man About the House (1973–1976). She also appeared as Janice in the film Straw Dogs (1971) and Nemo in Baxter! (1973).

Early life
Thomsett was born in Plumpton in 1950 to Maurice and Dorothy Thomsett (née Joy) and had three older brothers. She grew up in nearby Brighton and attended the Elm Grove Infants and Juniors School. One of her brothers offered her five shillings to audition for The Max Bygraves Summer Show. After doing so successfully, she appeared in several pantomimes until she left secondary school to attend Phildene Stage School in London.

Career
Out of drama school, Thomsett made several films for the Children’s Film Foundation and appeared in many popular television series, including Theatre 625, Dixon of Dock Green, Nearest and Dearest and Z-Cars. She also starred as Jennifer Villiers in the comedy series The Very Merry Widow from 1967 to 1968 and also its spin-off The Very Merry Widow and How in 1969.

The Railway Children
Thomsett was cast as Phyllis in The Railway Children despite the character being 11 years old and Thomsett being 20 at the time of filming. Jenny Agutter, who played her elder sister Bobbie in the film, was two years younger than Thomsett. Thomsett was contractually forbidden to reveal her age during production, and was likewise not allowed to smoke, drink, drive a car, or be seen in public with her boyfriend. The film crew were unaware of her true age, and treated her as they would a child (e.g. by giving her sweets), while addressing the younger Agutter as they would an adult.  During an appearance shortly afterwards on a BBC children's television programme, Thomsett was told, "I wouldn't dream of asking a lady her age, but you're obviously quite a bit older than the part you played in the film". She received a nomination for the BAFTA Film Award for Newcomer to Leading Film Roles.

Later career
Thomsett went on to appear in The Fenn Street Gang and Softly, Softly: Task Force before starring in the psychological thriller film Straw Dogs opposite Dustin Hoffman and Susan George, as well as Baxter! with Britt Ekland. After appearing in a television commercial advertising Bovril in 1972, Thomsett was spotted by directors Brian Cooke and Johnnie Mortimer, who cast her in the hit ITV sitcom Man About the House as Jo, a role that she played for the show's entire run from 1973 to 1976, including a 1974 spin-off film of the same name. 

After Man About the House ended in 1976, Thomsett continued to act, appearing in Wodehouse Playhouse in 1978. After appearing in a Crunchie chocolate bars advert in 1979, Thomsett gave up acting for a while in order to travel the world. She returned in the mid-1980s and appeared on stage in a 1987 production of The Cat and the Canary before making regular pantomime appearances. She also appeared in the music video for "Doctor in Distress", a charity single made to save Doctor Who from cancellation in 1985. Thomsett's career slowed down after the birth of her daughter, although she did appear on stage in 1998 and 1999 in a touring production of The Holly and the Ivy. 

Thomsett appeared in Peter Pan as Mrs. Darling at Doncaster Racecourse during the 2014–2015 Christmas season.

Filmography

Film

Television

References

External links
 

1950 births
Living people
English film actresses
English television actresses
Actresses from Sussex
People from Plumpton, East Sussex